True Dad Confession  is a 2016 South Korean television program that follows the lives of three celebrities who are fathers. It airs on Channel A every Wednesday at 21:30 (KST).

Content
True Dad Confession is an observational reality program depicting the daily lives of different fathers. This show portrays the fathers' yearning for their children's love and attention. True Dad Confession allows the fathers to finally have some bonding time with their children.

Hosts
 Kim Gura
 Joo Young-hoon
 Moon Hee-joon

Current families

Kim Family
 Kim Gura
 Kim Dong-hyeon (son)

Joo family
 Joo Young-hoon
 Lee Yun-Mi (wife)
 Joo Ara (daughter)
 Joo Rael (daughter)

Lee family
 Lee Jun-hyeok
 Ji Young-an (wife)
 Lee Ji-hoon (son)
 Lee Yeon-hoon (son)
 Lee Eun-seo (daughter)

Lee family
 Lee Yoon-suk
 Kim Soo-kyung (wife)
 Lee Seung-hyuk (son)

Kim family
Kim Hyung-kyu
Kim Yoon-ah (wife)
Kim Min-jae (son)

Former families

Kim Family
 Kim Young-ho 
 Kim Byeol (daughter)
 Kim Sol (daughter)
 Kim Gang (daughter)

Lee Family
 Lee Chang-hoon
 Kim Mi-jeong (wife)
 Lee Hyo-joo (daughter)

Kim family
 Kim Heung-gook
 Yoon Tae-young (wife)
 Kim Dong-hyun (son)
 Kim Joo-hyun (daughter)

Lee family
 Lee Han-wi
 Choi Hye-kyung (wife)
 Lee Kyung (daughter)
 Lee Yoon (daughter)
 Lee On (son)

Ratings
In the ratings below, the highest rating for the show will be in red, and the lowest rating for the show will be in blue each year.

2016

2017

References

External links
 

2016 South Korean television series debuts
Korean-language television shows
Channel A (TV channel) original programming
South Korean variety television shows